The climate of Tunisia is Mediterranean in the north, with mild rainy winters and hot, dry summers. The south of the country is desert. The terrain in the north is mountainous, which, moving south, gives way to a hot, dry central plain. The south is semiarid, and merges into the Sahara. A series of salt lakes, known as chotts or shatts, lie in an east–west line at the northern edge of the Sahara, extending from the Gulf of Gabes into Algeria.

Details

Tunisia's climate is divided into seven bioclimatic zones, with the main difference between the north and the rest of the country being due to the Tunisian hills which separate the regions subject to a Mediterranean climate and a typical hot desert climate of the Sahara - the largest hot desert in the world. Between them, there is a semi-arid climate with common characteristics between the two main climatic systems in the country.

Tunisia's climate is affected by various types of wind due to its geographical location: the northern coast is exposed to moderate and humid sea winds blowing from southern France, resulting in a significant decrease in temperatures and an increase in rainfall. In the south of the country, there are hot and dry continental winds, such as the Chergui wind, which blows over large desert areas causing a sudden rise in temperatures and a clear dry atmosphere. The country also benefits from a high amount of sunshine, exceeding 3000 hours per year, which reaches its peak in the southern desert, on the Algerian and Libyan borders.

Temperatures vary according to latitude, longitude, and proximity to the Mediterranean Sea. While temperatures can drop below 0 degrees Celsius in the winter in the Khemer Mountains (Kroumirie), the maximum temperature often rises to around 50 degrees Celsius in the desert regions in the summer. Average annual rainfall also varies by region, from about 1000 mm in the north to about 380 mm in the center and down to less than 50 mm in the far south.

Climate change

Tunisia has experienced a significant increase in temperatures over the 20th and early 21st centuries, with the average temperature rising by approximately 1.2°C from 1901 to 2020. This trend of rising temperatures is expected to continue, leading to numerous impacts on the country's ecosystems, agriculture, and human health.

Data

 References

External Links
[Earth]

Environment of Tunisia